Lafferty  is a sept of Irish Gaels in County Donegal and County Tyrone, belonging to the Cenél nEógain of the Northern Uí Néill. They are a branch of the O'Neill family and are named after one of the earlier Kings of Ailech called Flaithbertach mac Muirchertaig meic Néil. They are not to be confused with the O'Flaherty family of Connacht. Other anglicised versions of the name are O'Laverty, O'Lafferty and Laverty. 

Notable bearers of the name include:

 Daniel Lafferty (born 1989), Northern Irish footballer
 Don Lafferty (1933–1998), checkers player
 Jackson Lafferty (born 1969), Canadian politician
 James Lafferty (born 1985), American actor
 James Michael Lafferty (born 1963), American Businessman
 John Lafferty (1842–1903), American soldier and Medal of Honor recipient
 Justin Lafferty (born 1971), American politician
 Kyle Lafferty (born 1987), Northern Irish footballer
 Mike Lafferty (motorcycle racer) (born 1975), American Enduro racer
 Mike Lafferty (alpine skier) (born 1948), American former alpine skier
 Mur Lafferty (born 1973), American writer and podcaster
 R. A. Lafferty (1914–2002), science fiction and fantasy writer
 Sam Lafferty (born 1995), American ice hockey player
 Stephen W. Lafferty (born 1949), American politician
 Walter Lafferty (1875–1964), American politician

See also
 Branches of the Cenél nEógain

References

External links
History at Clan Lafferty